Uzhhorod is a city and municipality on the river Uzh in western Ukraine, at the border with Slovakia and near the border with Hungary. The city is approximately equidistant from the Baltic, the Adriatic and the Black Sea (650–690 km) making it the most inland city in this part of Europe. It is the administrative center of Zakarpattia Oblast (region), as well as the administrative center of the Uzhhorod Raion (district) within the oblast. Population:

Name
The city's earliest known name is Ungvár, from Hungarian Ung (River Uzh) and vár "castle, fortress", originally referring to a castle outside the city (probably Nevytske Castle).

The name Uzhhorod was coined in early 19th century Slavophile circles as a literal translation of the name Ungvár. The city officially adopted this name some time after 1920, under Czechoslovak administration.

History

Early history

Beginnings
In the migration period celts, sarmatians, huns, avars ruled the area. During the 9th century a fortified castle changed into a fortified early feudal town-settlement. The first mention of the settlement's name is "Hunguar" from  AD 1150 in Gesta Hungarorum. According to Gesta Hungarorum, at the time of the Hungarian conquest the fortified castle was under the rule of Laborc, who is most likely a fictional figure created by Anonymus, named after the nearby river Laborc.

Magyar conquest according to Anonymus (895)
Almos's Magyars who had arrived in the region from Kyiv (then known as Kevevara) stormed the Hunguar fortress in 895 AD. Having taken over the castle, Almos appointed his son Árpád as prince of Hunguaria and from Ungvar all of his warriors were called Hungarians instead. This is naiv folk etymology by the medieval writer. For further information on the ethnonym of the Hungarians see the article Name of Hungary.

10th–15th centuries
In the Kingdom of Hungary, the small town began to extend its borders. King Saint Stephen made it the centre (castrum) of Ung county with a strong military presence to protect the north east boarder of Hungary. In 1241–1242 the Mongols of Batu Khan burnt the settlement. After, in 1248 the city was granted town privileges by the King Béla IV of Hungary. In the early 14th century, Uzhhorod was involved in the civil wars in the interregnum between Hungarian barons  when the dynasty of Arpad died out. Finally Charles I. of Hungary from the Anjou dynasty, descendant of the House of Arpad by his mother occupied the throne. The Anjou House also ruled the Kingdom of Naples and the Hungarian king Charles I. invited the Drugeths (Italian counts from the Kingdom of Naples) into Hungary and gave the town to them. The Drugeth family became a member of the Hungarian nobility. During that period Philip Drugeth built Uzhhorod Castle. Together with the castle, the city began to grow. From 1430, Uzhhorod became a free royal town.

16th–18th centuries
During the 16–17th centuries The Kingdom of Hungary fell into three parts. The middle was occupied by the Ottoman Empire, the north west was ruled by the Habsburg dynasty, the eastern part became the Principality of Transylvania, that hold the independent Hungarian statehood. During this period there were many handicraft corporations in Uzhhorod. In this period the city was engaged in the religious and political fight between primarily Hungarian Protestant Transylvania and the German Catholic Austria. Each one wanted to reunite the Kingdom of Hungary under their rule. In 1646 the Union of Ungvár was proclaimed and the Greek-Catholic church was established, in a ceremony held in the Ungvár castle by the Vatican Aegis. In 1707 Ungvár was the residence of Ferenc II Rákóczi, leader of the national liberation war of Hungarians against Habsburgs. From 1780 the city became the capital of the Greek Catholic Eparchy and from 1776 the center of a newly created school district.

19th century

The beginning of the 19th century was characterized by economic changes, including the first factories in the city. The greatest influence on Ungvár among the political events of the 19th century was made by the Hungarian Revolution of 1848-1849, during which the native Hungarian nobility sought both to shake off the suzerainty of the Austrian Empire and to have authority over their own people. 27 March 1848 was officially celebrated in the city as the overthrow of the monarchy in Hungary. It is now celebrated in Hungary on 15 March.

In 1872 the first railway line opened, linking the city to the important railway junction of Chop, then known as Csap.

20th century
According to the 1910 census, the city had 16,919 inhabitants, of which 13,590 (80.3%) were Magyars, 1,219 (7.2%) Slovaks, 1,151 (6.8%) Germans, 641 (3.8%) Rusyns and 1.6% Czechs. By religion, 5,481 Roman Catholic, 5,305 Jewish, 4,473 Greek Catholic, 1,368 Calvinist. At the same time, the municipal area of the city had a population composed of 10,541 (39.05%) Hungarians, 9,908 (36.71%) Slovaks, and 5,520 (20.45%) Rusyns.

The First World War slowed down the tempo of city development. On 10 September 1919, Subcarpathia was officially allocated to the Republic of Czechoslovakia. Uzhhorod became the administrative center of the territory. During these years Uzhhorod developed into an architecturally modern city. 

After the First Vienna Award in 1938, Uzhhorod was given back to Hungary from which it was separated after WWI.

In 1941 the Jewish population reached 9,576. On 19 March 1944, Germans troops entered the city. They established a Judenrat (Jewish council) and set up two ghettos, at the Moskovitz brickyard and Gluck lumberyard. During May 1944, all Jews were deported to Auschwitz in five different transports and subsequently murdered. Only a few hundred Jews survived.

On 27 October 1944, the city was captured by the troops of the 4th Ukrainian Front of the Red Army. Thousands of ethnic Hungarians were killed, expelled, or else taken to work in Soviet forced labor camps. The Hungarian majority population was decimated in order to strengthen the Soviet and Ukrainian right to the city.

This period brought significant changes. On the outskirts of Uzhhorod new enterprises were constructed and the old enterprises were renewed. On 29 June 1945, Subcarpathian Ukraine was annexed by the Soviet Union and became a westernmost part of the Ukrainian SSR. That year the Uzhhorod State University (now Uzhhorod National University) was also opened. Since January 1946 Uzhhorod was the center of newly formed Zakarpatska oblast.

Since 1991 Uzhhorod has become one of 24 regional capitals within Ukraine. Of these, Uzhhorod is the smallest and westernmost.

21st century
In 2002, a bust of Tomáš Masaryk, Czechoslovakia's first president, was unveiled in a main square of the city. A similar bust was unveiled in 1928 on the 10th anniversary of Czechoslovak independence, but was removed by the Hungarians when they took over the region in 1939.

On 15 April 2022, as part of the derussification campaign that swept through Ukraine following the February 2022 Russian invasion of Ukraine, the Uzhhorod City Council decided to rename 58 streets connected to Russian figures.

United States First Lady Jill Biden visited the city on 8 May 2022, which was not announced to the public until after the visit.

Climate

Uzhhorod has a humid continental climate (Köppen: Dfb) with cool to cold winters and warm summers. On average, Uzhhorod receives 2023 hours of sunshine per year.

Demographics
According to the Ukrainian 2001 census, the population of Uzhhorod included:
 Ukrainians including Rusyns (77.8%)
 Russians (9.6%)
 Hungarians (6.9%)
 Slovaks (2.2%)
 Romani (1.5%)

Transportation

The city is served by Uzhhorod railway station and has railway connections with Chop and Lviv. It is also served by Uzhhorod International Airport.

Sport
The city was home to the SC Rusj Užhorod football club from 1925. Contemporary side FC Hoverla Uzhhorod made their debut in the Ukrainian Premier League in 2001, but dissolved in 2016 due to money issues.

In 2020 professional football matches at the highest levels of Ukraine returned to Uzhhorod since the 2020–21 season FC Mynai plays its home matches in the Avanhard Stadium. FC Uzhhorod currently in Ukrainian Second League also plays its matches at Avanhard Stadium.

International relations

Uzhhorod is currently twinned with:

  Békéscsaba, Hungary
  Nyíregyháza, Hungary
  Szombathely, Hungary
  Trogir, Croatia
  Pula, Croatia
  Corvallis, Oregon, US
  Darmstadt, Germany, since 1992
  Košice, Slovakia, since 1993
  Krosno, Poland, since 2008
  Jarosław, Poland, since 2002
  Česká Lípa, Czech Republic
  Satu Mare, Romania
  Târgu Mureș, Romania

Notable people 

 Arieh Atzmoni (1926–2005) an Israeli soldier rewarded with the Hero of Israel
 János Erdélyi (1814 in Veľké Kapušany – 1868) Hungarian poet, critic, author and philosopher.
 Renée Firestone (born 1924), Holocaust survivor, fashion designer
 Lisa Fittko (1909–2005) author and helper to many escaping Nazi-occupied France during WWII.
 Wilem Frischmann (born 1931) WWII refugee, became a leading British engineer
 Shlomo Ganzfried (1804–1886), an Orthodox rabbi of Ungvar and posek
 József Gáti (1885-1945) an ethnic Hungarian communist politician from Subcarpathian Rus
 Jenő Janovics (1872–1945) a Hungarian film director, screenwriter and actor of the silent era. 
 Józef Kasparek (1915 in Broumov - 2002), a Polish lawyer, historian and political scientist in the US; carried out covert operations in Carpathian Rus 1938/39.
 Mikhail Kopelman (born 1947), a Russian-American violinist, first violin in the Kopelman Quartet
 Joseph L. Kun (1882–1961), emigrated to the US aged 4, became a judge in Pennsylvania
 Serhiy Kvit (born 1965), a Ukrainian literary critic, journalist, educator and social activist.
 Samuel Lipschütz (1863–1905), a chess player and author
 Nil Lushchak (born 1973) a Ruthenian Catholic hierarch for Mukachevo.
 Jonathan Markovitch (born 1967) a Ukrainian rabbi and the Chief rabbi of Kyiv
 József Örmény (born 1960), a Ukrainian pianist of Hungarian origin.
 Ilka Pálmay (1859–1945), a Hungarian-born singer and actress.
 Géza Pap (1883-1912), socialist from the Austro-Hungarian Empire
 Dezső Pattantyús-Ábrahám (1875–1973) a Hungarian politician from an ancient and noble family
 Serhiy Ratushniak (born 1961) former long-term Mayor of Uzhhorod, 1994–2002 & 2006–2010
 Lika Roman (born 1985), a Ukrainian model, charity worker and Miss Ukraine, 2007
 Zsuzsanna Sirokay (born 1941) a Hungarian pianist, she lives in Switzerland. 
 Avgustyn Voloshyn (1874 in Kelechyn – 1945), a Subcarpathian politician, teacher and priest
 Yolka (born 1982), singer, songwriter, recording artist, presenter and actress. 
 Anatoly Zatin (born 1954), a Mexican composer, pianist and orchestral conductor
 Gregory Zatkovich (1886 in Holubyne – 1967), an American lawyer and first governor of Carpathian Ruthenia
 Paul Zatkovich (1852—1916) newspaper editor and cultural activist for Rusyns in the US.

Sport 
 Matviy Bobal (born 1984) a Ukrainian football forward with ca. 300 club caps
 Juraj Demeč (born 1945) a Czechoslovak former track and field athlete who competed at the 1972 Summer Olympics
 Vladimir Koman (born 1989), a footballer with nearly 300 club caps and 36 for Hungary
 Vladyslav Mykulyak (born 1984) a Ukrainian retired footballer with 320 club caps.
 Yozhef Sabo (born 1940), a former football player with 347 club caps and 76 for the Soviet Union
 György Sándor (born 1984) a Carpathian Ruthenian footballer with 370 club caps and 9 for Hungary
 István Sándor (born 1986) an Hungarian footballer with 380 club caps
 Daria Shestakova (born 1996) a Russian rugby sevens player.
 Tetyana Trehubová (born 1989) a Ukrainian-born Slovak handball player.

See also
 Bridges in Uzhhorod
 Uzhgorod Synagogue
 Zakarpattia Oblast

References

Further reading
 Rampley, Matthew (2019). "Uzhhorod Modernism" (2019). https://craace.com/2019/05/09/uzhhorod-modernism/

External links

 Official website of the City
 Official website of Uzhhorod National University
 Uzhhorod in old postcards
 Uzhhorod Modernism Architectural Manual

 
Cities in Zakarpattia Oblast
Shtetls
Populated places established in the 9th century
Cities of regional significance in Ukraine
Oblast centers in Ukraine